First Strike Still Deadly is the ninth studio album by Testament, released in 2001. It consists of re-recorded songs released on The Legacy and The New Order, as well as a re-recording of "Reign of Terror", which was originally on Legacy's Demo 1 and appeared as a B-side from the "Trial by Fire" single; the latter version also appeared on the 1993 EP Return to the Apocalyptic City. On some Japanese versions of this release, a different cover is present, and the disc is an enhanced CD and includes a bonus documentary with live clips of various incarnations of the band.

First Strike Still Deadly saw a Testament reunion with three former or current members (guitarist Alex Skolnick, bassist Steve DiGiorgio and drummer John Tempesta) as well as their original singer Steve "Zetro" Souza. Souza, Skolnick and Tempesta did not officially rejoin Testament at the time of its recording, though Skolnick did in 2005 and is still a member of the band to this day. First Strike Still Deadly was also the last Testament album with bassist DiGiorgio before his return in 2014.

Reception

First Strike Still Deadly has received mostly negative reviews. AllMusic writer Brian O'Neill awards the album one star out of five, and criticizes, "Re-recording one's hits is worse than live albums because it tries to be something it never can be, and this disc is no exception. Get the originals, or even the two Testament hits compilations, for the real deal; check this out if karaoke is your idea of contemporary entertainment."

Track listing

Charts

Credits

Musicians 
Chuck Billy – vocals (tracks 1-9)
Steve "Zetro" Souza – vocals (tracks 10 and 11)
Alex Skolnick – lead guitar
Eric Peterson – lead and rhythm guitar
Steve DiGiorgio – bass
John Tempesta – drums

Other 
Andy Sneap – mixing

References 

2001 albums
Testament (band) albums
Spitfire Records albums